Gastão Luís Henrique Robert d'Escragnolle, Baron d'Escragnolle (Rio de Janeiro, April 16, 1821 — Rio de Janeiro, June 16, 1886) was a Brazilian politician, military figure and nobleman. He was son of French noblemen Alexandre Louis Marie de Robert, count d'Escragnolle (1785 — 1828), and Adelaïde Françoise Madeleine de Beaurepaire-Rohan (1785 - 1840).

He was the aide-de-camp of Luís Alves de Lima e Silva, the Duke of Caxias. He would later abandon his career as a lieutenant colonel to dedicate himself to politics, in the area of public administration.

One of his sisters, Gabriela d'Escragnolle, married the painter Félix Taunay; one of their sons is the famous novelist and politician Alfredo d'Escragnolle Taunay, the Viscount of Taunay.

References

External links
 About Gastão d'Escragnolle 

1821 births
1886 deaths
Brazilian nobility
Brazilian people of French descent
19th-century Brazilian people
19th-century Brazilian politicians